Mumbi Kwesele (born February 26, 1995) is an American soccer player who plays as a midfielder for Bay Cities FC in the National Independent Soccer Association.

Career

College
Kwesele attended Barry University in 2015, where he played for two seasons. He transferred to Humboldt State University where he played during their 2016 and 2017 seasons.

Professional
On October 14, 2020, Kwesele moved to Spanish side Real Unión B, who play in the fifth-tier.

On February 26, 2020, he joined USL League One side Richmond Kickers.

Personal
Mumbi's brother is Mutanda Kwesele, who also played professional soccer.

References

External links

1995 births
Living people
American soccer players
American expatriate soccer players
Association football midfielders
Barry Buccaneers men's soccer players
Humboldt State Lumberjacks men's soccer players
Richmond Kickers players
Soccer players from Seattle
USL League One players
American expatriate sportspeople in Spain
Expatriate footballers in Spain
Bay Cities FC players
National Independent Soccer Association players